Karl Koester (born 2 April 1843 in Bad Dürkheim, died 2 December 1904 in Bonn) was a German pathologist and rector of the University of Bonn from 1898 to 1899. He was professor of pathology and director of the Institute of Pathology at the University of Bonn from 1874 to 1904. He held the title Geheimer Medizinalrat.

Koester studied medicine in Munich, Tübingen and Würzburg, and obtained his doctoral degree in Würzburg in 1867. His doctoral advisor and mentor was Friedrich Daniel von Recklinghausen, and he subsequently worked as Recklinghausen's assistant. From 1873 to 1874 he was professor of general medical pathology and anatomical pathology at the University of Giessen. He succeeded Eduard von Rindfleisch as professor of pathology at the University of Bonn in 1874.

In 1868 he published Ueber die feinere Structur der menschlichen Nabelschnur ("On the finer structure of the human umbilical cord").

He became a member of the German National Academy of Sciences Leopoldina in 1880.

Selected works 
 Cancroid mit hyaliner Degeneration (Cylindroma Billroth's), Berlin, 1867
 Ueber die feinere Structur der menschlichen Nabelschnur (diss.), Würzburg, 1868
 Die Entwicklung der Carcinome und Sarcome, Würzburg, 1869
 Die embolische Endcartitis, Berlin, 1878
 Ueber Freizügigkeit der Studierenden der Medizin an den Universitäten deutscher Zunge, Bonn, 1884
 Über Myokarditis, Bonn, 1888

References

German pathologists
Ludwig Maximilian University of Munich alumni
University of Tübingen alumni
University of Würzburg alumni
Academic staff of the University of Würzburg
Academic staff of the University of Giessen
Academic staff of the University of Bonn
People from Bad Dürkheim (district)
1843 births
1904 deaths
Members of the German Academy of Sciences Leopoldina